John Weimer may refer to:
 John L. Weimer (born 1954), American judge
 John W. Weimer (1883–1940), American football, basketball, and baseball player and coach